FAST (Fluorescence-Activating and absorption-Shifting Tag) is a small, genetically-encoded, protein tag which allows for fluorescence reporting of proteins of interest.  Unlike natural fluorescent proteins and derivates such as GFP or mCherry, FAST is not fluorescent by itself.  It can bind selectively a fluorogenic chromophore derived from 4-hydroxybenzylidene rhodanine (HBR), which is itself non fluorescent unless bound.  Once bound, the pair of molecules goes through a unique fluorogen activation mechanism based on two spectroscopic changes, increase of fluorescence quantum yield and absorption red shift, hence providing high labeling selectivity.  The FAST-fluorogen reporting system can be used in fluorescence microscopy, flow cytometry and any other fluorometric method to explore the living world: biosensors, protein trafficking.

FAST, a small 14 kDa protein, was engineered from the photoactive yellow protein (PYP) by directed evolution.  It was reported for the first time in 2016 by researchers from Ecole normale supérieure de Paris.


Mechanism 
FAST pertains to a chemical-genetic strategy for specific labeling of proteins.  A peptide domain, called "tag", is genetically encoded to be bound to a protein of interest (by combination of their respective genes by means of transfection or infection).  This tag is the anchor for a synthetic fluorescent probe to be further added.  Such chemical-genetic approach was already implemented besides natural fluorescent proteins such as GFP or their derivatives such as mCherry in several systems already widely used:

 since 2003, SNAP-tag, a bi-component reporting system consisting of a 19 kDa peptide derived from a human enzyme, O6-methylguanine-ADN methyltransferase, evolved to form covalent bonds with fluorescent O6-benzylguanine derivatives; SNAP-tag was later evolved into an orthogonal tag, CLIP-tag;
 since 2008, HaloTag, a bi-component reporting system consisting of a 33 kDa peptide derived from a bacterial enzyme, a haloalkane deshalogenase, which can specifically bind functional halogenated synthetic ligands, most often fluorescent for cell imaging (e.g., Coumarine, Oregon Green, Alexa Fluor 488, diAcFAM, TMR).

Several versions of FAST have been described differing by a small number of mutations, e.g., FAST1 (a.k.a. Y-FAST), FAST2 (a.k.a. iFAST), or a dimer, td-FAST.  Also, a complementation split version for monitoring protein-protein interactions was developed, splitFAST.  A number of plasmids displaying FAST or splitFAST genes are available at Addgene.

Applications 
The FAST-fluorogen reporting system is used in fluorescence microscopy, flow cytometry and any other fluorometric methods to explore the living world, including biosensors and protein trafficking.  FAST has been reported for dynamic imaging of biofilms because of its unique capacity of fluorescence in low-oxygen conditions.  For the same reason it allows for imaging and FACSing anaerobes, such as Clostridium, used for biomass fermentatio like the ABE fermentation.  FAST has also been reported for super-resolution microscopy of living cells.

A number of fluorogens were developed for FAST and its derivates by The Twinkle Factory, varying by their emission wavelength, their brightness and their tag affinity.  Some are non permeant, i.e., they can't go through cell membranes, hence specifically labeling membrane proteins or extracellular proteins, allowing for, e.g., monitoring trafficking from synthesis until excretion.

References 

Proteins
Biochemistry methods